The ELCA Youth Gathering is a national convention of the Evangelical Lutheran Church in America for high-school-age youth. It is held every 3 years in a different American city. The gathering lasts around 5 days and each day is focused on a form of service. Each convention also has a central theme to it. Each theme is focused on a certain scripture from the bible.

The 1979, 1982 and 1985 Youth Gatherings were a ministry of the American Lutheran Church. The ELCA officially came into existence on January 1, 1988, by the merging of three Lutheran church bodies, including the American Lutheran Church.

From 2000 to 2006, a different format was tried in which the gathering was held for two weeks with certain churches coming to the convention one week and the other churches coming to it the second week. This was later merged into one week in 2009.

Specific Gatherings

New Orleans 2009
In July, 37,000 Lutheran youth and their chaperones attended a gathering in New Orleans to help with post-Katrina problems in the city and surrounding suburbs. "This was the biggest convention since Katrina", said bestofneworleans.com. The theme for this gathering in New Orleans was "Jesus, Justice, Jazz." The Bible theme for this convention was Philippians 2: 1-8. Usually, the host city is chosen immediately after the last gathering, but organizers were not able to pick New Orleans three years in advance because they did not know if New Orleans was capable of holding such a gathering. Organizers saw the city, and decided to use New Orleans after requests to use other cities were denied. Though there was opposition to the convention taking place in New Orleans, due to rising crime rates and its reputation for adult sensuality, organizers came upon the agreement that New Orleans needed them as much as they needed New Orleans.

Unlike the 2006 gathering, which was split into two one-week groups, the 2009 gathering would only be one week. The change shifted from 20,000 people each week, to 36,000 in one week. This is roughly a sixth of New Orleans's population. The days were split in two, with the mornings focusing on either Jesus, justice, or jazz (in line with the theme of the gathering). On the day focused on Jesus, the youth would search their spiritual lives. On the day focused on jazz, the youth learned about the stories and experiences New Orleans had during Hurricane Katrina. On the day focused on justice, the youth took part in various activities including replanting marsh grasses; restoring Holt Cemetery through weeding, planting and fixing grave stones; hosting community fairs to promote health and literacy; and painting and fixing up broken homes.

Guest Speakers

C. Ray Nagin: Mayor of New Orleans
Marc Kielburger: founder of Free the Children
Pastor Jay Bakker
Viola Vaughn: started the village school for girls in Senegal, West Africa
Becca Stevens, founder of Thistle Farms and Magdalene
Spencer West: overcoming adversity and living life without legs
Michel Chikwanine: child soldier from Uganda
Donald Miller: author of Blue Like Jazz
Anne Mahlum: founder of Back on My Feet
Venice Williams: worked with community gardens

Musicians

Agape
Group1Crew
Celia Whitler http://celiamusic.net
Skillet
Lost and Found
The Flying Karamazov Brothers
The Katinas
Guyland Leday: 9 yr old accordion player
Amanda Shaw: 16 yr old violinist
Rachel Kurtz

New Orleans 2012
The 2012 ELCA Youth Gathering took place in New Orleans, from July 18–22. 33,309 youth and chaperones attended this gathering, going out to over 400 different volunteer sites on the Practice Justice Day. The theme for the 2012 gathering was "Citizens with the Saints". The Mercedes-Benz Superdome, affectionately re-dubbed the "LutherDome", reprised its role from the 2009 event and hosted a mass gathering each evening the 18th to the 21st, and a final morning service on July 22. Each of the three full days of the gathering (July 19–21) was designated for a different "practice" of faith. On Practice Peacemaking day, youth were encouraged to visit exhibitions, participate in sports and other activities, donate hair, blood, and money to build wells at the Ernest N. Morial Convention Center. Practice Justice day saw the youth coming together to complete volunteer service projects. Finally, Practice Discipleship was a day of worship and bible study in which each church's group met with other groups from the same synod. This was the first time any city had hosted a third gathering, as well as the first time two consecutive gatherings have been held in the same city.
The "LutherDome" sessions were emceed by students Kaelie Lund and Josiah Williams. Speakers and performers, organized by night, included:

Wednesday July 18th

Rev. Yehiel Curry
Bishop Michael Rinehart
Pastor Nadia Bolz-Weber
AGAPE (Christian Rapper)
Rachel Kurtz (Christian Singer)
Roots of Music (local New Orleans children's music program)
Lost and Found (Musical Act)

Thursday July 19th

Shane Claiborne
Mark Hanson, Presiding Bishop of the ELCA
Valerie Rivas
Eric Hoelzi
Megan Stubbs
Elijah Furquan (musical act)
Tony Memmel (musical act)
Aaron Strumpel (musical act)

Friday July 20th

Leymah Gbowee, 2011 Nobel Peace Prize Laureate
Kelly Wallace
Diane Latiker
Jamie Nabozny
Rhema Soul (musical act)
Lost and Found (musical act)

Saturday July 21st

Rev. Andrena Ingram
Greg von Wald
Preservation Hall Junior Jazz and Heritage Brass Band (local New Orleans children's and adolescent's musical act)
Switchfoot (alternative / Christian rock band)

Detroit 2015
The 2015 ELCA Youth Gathering took place in Detroit, from July 15–19. Over 30,000 youth and chaperones attended this gathering, going out to over 600 different volunteer sites on the Proclaim Justice Day. The theme for the 2015 gathering was "Rise Up". Ford Field, hosted a mass gathering each evening the 15th to the 18th, and a final morning service on July 19. Each of the three full days of the gathering (July 15–19) was designated for a different "practice" of faith. On Proclaim Community day, youth were encouraged to visit exhibitions, participate in sports and other activities, donate hair, blood, and money to build wells at the Cobo Center. Proclaim Justice day saw the youth coming together to complete volunteer service projects. Finally, Proclaim Story was a day of worship and bible study in which each church's group met with other groups from the same synod. This was the first time Detroit had hosted a gathering.

Speakers and performers at the Ford Field nightly sessions, organized by night, included:

Wednesday July 15th

Elizabeth Eaton, Presiding Bishop of the ELCA
Mikka McCracken
Rev. Dr. Luke A. Powery
Agape (Christian rapper)
Lost and Found (musical act)

Thursday July 16th

Karis Ailabouni
Eric Barreto
Rev. Alexia Salvatierra

Friday July 17th

Rani Abdulmasih
Sarah Funkhouser
Steve Jerbi
Emily Scott
The Temptations

Saturday July 18th

Kyle Larson
Veronika Scott
Rozella White
Marian Wright Edelman
Skillet (band)

Houston 2018 
The 2018 ELCA Youth Gathering took place in Houston, from June 27th to July 1st. The theme for the 2018 gathering was "This Changes Everything". Mass gathering events were held at NRG Stadium on the evenings of June 27th to the 30th and a final morning service on July 1st. July 28th to 30th were designated as a 3-day rotation of Learning Days for the time leading up to the gathering. On Synod Day, gatherers met with their respective synods for worship and fellowship in designated locations. On the day of Service Learning, gatherers were split into groups and engaged in various service projects throughout Houston. Being that the city was in the aftermath of Hurricane Harvey, many of these service projects related to construction. Gatherers were invited to "shift" their perspective of service "by focusing on stories, healing, intersections, faith, and togetherness". Once their respective service projects was finished, each of the groups arrived at NRG Arena for various activities. On the day of Interactive Learning, attendees gathered at NRG Center and engaged in various interactive activities and learning opportunities throughout the venue.

Speakers and Performers organized by night are:

Wednesday June 27th

Speakers 

 Prairie Rose Seminole
 Bishop Michael Rinehart
 Rev. Tuhina Rasche
 Debora D.E.E.P Mouton
 Elizabeth Eaton, Presiding Bishop of the ELCA

Performers 

 Agape (Christian Rapper)
 LZ7
 Josiah Williams
 Ginny Owens

Thursday June 28th

Speakers 

 Caroline Meeker
 Rev. Aaron Fuller
 Deacon Erin Power
 Marlon Hall

Performers 

 Ryan Brown
 Rachel Kurtz
 Guardians Drum and Bugle Corps

Friday June 29th

Speakers 

 Elizabeth Peter
 Rev. Will Starkweather
 Michaela Shelly
 Rev. Nadia Bolz-Weber
 Jasmine Seguarra

Performers 

 Tauren Wells

Saturday June 30th

Speakers 

 Rev. Dr. Stephen Bouman
 Deborah D.E.E.P Mouton
 Carson McCullar
 Joe Davis
 Jaime & Rebekah Bruesehoff
 Maria Rose Belding

Performers 

 Tenth Avenue North

Sunday July 1st

Speakers 

 Elizabeth Eaton, Presiding Bishop of the ELCA
 Savanna Sullivan

Locations and themes of the ELCA Youth Gathering (1979–present) 

*The Gathering, originally scheduled for 2021, was rescheduled for 2022 due to the Covid 19 pandemic before it was canceled.

Evangelical Lutheran Church in America

References